This is a list of Bulgarian regents. A regent, from the Latin regens ("one who reigns"), is a person selected to act as head of state (ruling or not) because the ruler is a minor, not present, or debilitated.

Middle Ages 
Kavhan Isbul was regent after the death of Khan Omurtag, when his successor Khan Malamir was still a minor. He was also regent of Presiyan I, the minor nephew of Malamir.

On behalf of the infant king Кoloman I Asen (1241–1246), the country was ruled by a regency. When he died, a regency council led by Irina Komnina ruled on behalf of King Michael II Asen from 1246–1253.

A regency council on behalf of Ivan IV Smilets headed by his mother Smiltsena and despot Eltimir ruled from 1298–1299.

Regents after Prince Alexander I
Stefan Stambolov, Sava Mutkurov and Petko Karavelov (replaced by Georgi Zhivkov) were regents after the abdication of Prince Alexander Battenberg in August 1886 until the election and inauguration of the new Prince Ferdinand I Saxe-Coburg-Gotha in August 1887.

Regents for Tsar Simeon II

See also
Regency
List of regents
List of heads of state of Bulgaria
President of Bulgaria
Prime Minister of Bulgaria
Monarchy of Bulgaria

Notes and references 

Bulgaria
Bulgaria
Heads of state of Bulgaria
Regents
Regents
Regents